Gemma Jackson is a British production designer who has worked on both television and film. She has won two Emmys, one for the television show Game of Thrones and the other for the mini-series John Adams.

She was nominated at the 77th Academy Awards in the category of Best Art Direction for her work on the film Finding Neverland. She shared her nomination with Trisha Edwards.

She is married to production designer Andrew McAlpine.

Selected filmography

 The Girl in the Picture (1985)
 Paperhouse (1988)
 Chicago Joe and the Showgirl (1990)
 The Miracle (1991)
 Blame It on the Bellboy (1992)
 A Far Off Place (1993)
 Squanto: A Warrior's Tale (1994)
 Tom and Huck (1995)
 The Borrowers (1997)
 Bridget Jones's Diary (2001)
 Iris (2001)
 Killing Me Softly (2002)
 Finding Neverland (2004)
 Bridget Jones: The Edge of Reason (2004)
 Death Defying Acts (2007)
 The Other Man (2008)
 King Arthur: Legend of the Sword (2017)
 Aladdin (2019)
 The Gentlemen (TBA)

References

External links

Living people
1951 births
Primetime Emmy Award winners
British art directors
British film designers
People from Guildford
Best Production Design AACTA Award winners
Women production designers